Zăbrani is a commune in Arad County, Romania. It is situated in the eastern part of the Vinga Plateau, in its contact zone with the Lipova Hills. Its administrative territory stretches over 11,778 hectares. It is composed of three villages: Chesinț (Lippakeszi), Neudorf (Temesújfalu) and Zăbrani (situated at 29 km from Arad).

Population
According to the last census the population of the commune counts 4472 inhabitants, out of which 95.6% are Romanians, 1.7% Hungarians, 1.2% Germans, 1.3% Ukrainians and 0.2% are of other or undeclared nationalities.

History
In the archaeological site of Zăbrani two settlements from the palaeolithic period, respectively from the Iron Age. The first documentary record of Zăbrani dates back to 1080–1090. Chesinț was attested documentarily in 1334, while Neudorf in 1723.

Economy
Although the economy of the commune is mainly of agrarian type, based on livestock-breeding and olericulture, light industry and small industry are also well represented in its economic spectrum.

Tourism
The touristic potential of the town is one exceptional. Zăbrani commune has been included in the category of   territorial administrative units with high concentrate of valuable built patrimony. Among the most important touristic sights of the commune we can mention the rural architectural complex in Zăbrani dating from the 9th century, the Roman Catholic church in the centre of Neudorf village (1771), the crypt of Archduchess Maria Anna of Austria in Neudorf (1809) with a funeral monument raised in 1841, as well as the memorial museum of Adam Müller-Guttenbrunn, an outstanding personality of German literature.

Notable people
 Adam Müller-Guttenbrunn, writer
 Gerhardt Csejka, translator
 Ernest Wichner, translator

References

Communes in Arad County
Localities in Crișana
Former Danube Swabian communities in Romania